The 2011 Supertaça Cândido de Oliveira was the 33rd edition of the Supertaça Cândido de Oliveira, the annual Portuguese football season-opening match contested by the winners of the previous season's top league and cup competitions (or cup runner-up in case the league- and cup-winning club is the same). The 2011 edition opposed Porto, the 2010–11 Primeira Liga and 2010–11 Taça de Portugal title holders, and Vitória de Guimarães, the 2010–11 Taça de Portugal runners-up.

Porto defeated Vitória de Guimarães 2–1, with two goals from Portuguese centre back Rolando, and collected their third consecutive Super Cup, raising the club's tally to 18 trophies in this competition (54.5% of wins).

Match details

References

Supertaça Cândido de Oliveira
FC Porto matches
Vitória S.C. matches
2011–12 in Portuguese football